Brian Ó Cuív (1916 – 14 November 1999) was a Celtic scholar who specialised in Irish history and philology.

Life
Ó Cuív was professor of Celtic Studies at University College Dublin and later at the Dublin Institute for Advanced Studies. His later years were devoted to the compilation of a catalogue of the Irish manuscripts in the University of Oxford. The completed catalogue was published after his death.

He married Emer de Valera—who would become the last surviving daughter of Éamon de Valera—with whom he had nine children. She died in 2012. A son, Éamon Ó Cuív, is a prominent Irish politician.

Surname
Ó Cuív's surname was changed from Ó Caoimh (O'Keeffe) by his father, Shán Ó Cuív, a Cork journalist, who in the early 20th century changed the spelling of his surname to conform with a simplified spelling system of his own invention, which he called An Leitriú Shimplí. The letter 'v' is extremely rare in Irish outside modern loanwords.

Works
His works include:
The Irish of West Muskerry, Co. Cork: A Phonetic Study (1951)
Irish Dialects and Irish Speaking Districts: Three Lectures (1951)
Parliament Na mBan, editor (1952)
Seven Centuries of Irish Learning: 1000–1700 (1961)
A View of the Irish Language (1969)
The Linguistic Training of the Mediaeval Irish Poet (1973)
The Impact of the Scandinavian Invasions on the Celtic-speaking Peoples c. 800–1100 A.D. (1983)
Catalogue of Irish Manuscripts in the Bodleian Library at Oxford and Oxford College Libraries (2001-03) 2 vols. Dublin: Dublin Institute for Advanced Studies, School of Celtic Studies

Footnotes

External links
 A title-index of Ó Cuív's publications, 1942 – 1971
 Ó Cuív (Brian)

1916 births
1999 deaths
Academics of University College Dublin
Academics of the Dublin Institute for Advanced Studies
Celtic studies scholars
Linguists from Ireland
20th-century Irish historians
De Valera family
Irish-language writers
20th-century linguists